Kalpokas is a surname. Notable people with the surname include: 

Donald Kalpokas (1943–2019), Vanuatuan politician and diplomat
Petras Kalpokas (1880–1945), Lithuanian artist and professor